Fifth-seeded René Lacoste defeated Jean Borotra in the final, 7–5, 6–1, 6–4 to win the men's singles tennis title at the 1925 French Championships. The draw consisted of 61 players of whom 16 were seeded. This was the first time the French Championships was staged as a Grand Slam event.

Seeds

Draw

Finals

Top half

Section 1

Section 2

Bottom half

Section 3

Section 4

References

External links
 

French Championships – Men's Singles
French Championships (tennis) by year – Men's singles